Clavula may refer to:

 Clavula, a synonym for a genus of sedges, Eleocharis
 Clavula, a synonym for a genus of hydrozoans, Turritopsis
 Clavula (fungal morphology)